Schlacht may refer to:

 Schlacht, a 2007 album by Avatar
 Schlachtflugzeug, or ground-attack aircraft

See also
 
 Schlecht, a surname